Paul Michael Gorman (born 18 September 1968, in Macclesfield) is an English former professional footballer who played in the Football League, as a forward.

References

Sources
Profile at Neil Brown

1968 births
Living people
Sportspeople from Macclesfield
English footballers
Association football forwards
Doncaster Rovers F.C. players
Fisher Athletic F.C. players
Charlton Athletic F.C. players
Welling United F.C. players
English Football League players